All Saints' College is an undergraduate and postgraduate women's college located in Thiruvananthapuram, Kerala. It was established in the year 1964. It is a Christian minority educational institution run by the Congregation of Carmelite Religious - CCR. The college is affiliated with Kerala University. This college offers different courses in arts, commerce and science. Prof.( Dr.) Reshmi R Prasad is the principal of the college since June 2021.

Departments

Science
Physics
Chemistry
Mathematics and Statistics
Botany
Zoology
Environmental Science

Arts and commerce
Malayalam
English
Hindi
History and Politics
Economics
Physical Education
French
Commerce

Accreditation
The college is  recognized by the University Grants Commission (UGC).

Notable alumni
 Arya Rajendran, mayor of Thiruvananthapuram Corporation
 Parvathy Thiruvothu, actress
 Nyla Usha actress, radio jockey
 Annie, actress
 Parvathi T., actress, activist
 Judit Cleetus, Sports Player

References

External links
http://www.allsaintscollege.ac.in

Educational institutions established in 1964
1964 establishments in Kerala
Arts and Science colleges in Kerala
Colleges affiliated to the University of Kerala
Colleges in Thiruvananthapuram